XHTEQ-FM is a noncommercial radio station on 107.9 FM in Tequila, Jalisco, known as Tequila FM. It is one of two permit stations operated by Grupo Radiofónico ZER via permitholder Impulsa por el Bien Común de Jalisco, A.C.

History
XHTEQ received its permit on April 30, 2013. It broadcasts from the Edificio Mario Talavera.

References

Radio stations in Jalisco